Francois Daniel "Slak" van Wyk (born 30 July 1991) is a South African rugby union player who currently plays as a loosehead prop for Leicester Tigers in England's Premiership Rugby.

Career

He was also a member of the  side which lifted the 2011 Varsity Cup, playing in all of his side's 9 games and featuring alongside future Western Force team-mate Marcel Brache.

Opportunities at provincial level proved harder to come by and he only managed 2 appearances for Western Province, both of which came during the 2013 Vodacom Cup.   This limitation in game time saw him move to Australia to link up with the Perth based Western Force.

For 2014, Van Wyk was named as a member of the Force's Wider Training Group alongside Ollie Hoskins, Brad Lacey, Dillyn Leyds and Dylan Sage.

It was announced on May 10, 2017 that Van Wyk would join English side Northampton Saints for the 2017/18 campaign. He will leave at the end of the 2020–21 season.

On 8 March 2021, it was confirmed that van Wyk would sign for local rivals Leicester Tigers in the Premiership Rugby from the 2021-22 season. Van Wyk made his Leicester debut against Exeter Chiefs on 18 September 2021. On 30 October 2021, van Wyk scored his first try for Leicester in the East Midlands Derby against his former club, Northampton Saints. Van Wyk was sent off on 3 December 2022 after coming on as a substitute in a match against Bristol Bears.

Super Rugby Statistics

References

1991 births
Living people
Afrikaner people
Expatriate rugby union players in Australia
Leicester Tigers players
Northampton Saints players
Perth Spirit players
Rugby union players from Bellville, South Africa
Rugby union props
South African expatriates in Australia
South African rugby union players
Western Force players
Western Province (rugby union) players